Radium carbonate is a compound of radium, carbon, and oxygen. This salt is a poisonous, radioactive, amorphous, white powder that is used in medicine. It is notable for being more soluble than barium carbonate, unlike other radium compounds. Even though it is insoluble in water, it is soluble in dilute acids and concentrated ammonium carbonate.

Preparation
Radium carbonate can be produced by using Ra2+ ions and carbonate:

Ra2+ + CO32- → RaCO3

Because of the very low solubility of this salt, it will form a white precipitate.

Reactions
Radium carbonate can be used to produce radium nitrate and other radium salts:

RaCO3 + 2HNO3 → Ra(NO3)2 +  H2O + CO2

References 

Radium compounds
Carbonates